Way & Bar is the 1980 album by John Otway & Wild Willy Barrett. Their last on Polydor, it also proved to be the 2nd split of the duo lasting until The Wimp and The Wild. The name Way & Bar is derived from the billboard on the back of the DK 50/80 single being cropped for the front cover. In this case, the words 'Otway & Barrett' wrap around the sleeve and the rest of the text appears on the back cover.

History 
As with Barrett's solo album Call of the Wild and single "A Shot of Red Eye", the album was recorded at Barrett's Place; a farm at Gawcott, just off Aylesbury.

The intro of DK 50/80 is a sample of two girls from a band called Sausage singing "K.D. 80/50 / You’re so nifty / K.D. 80/50 / You’re so nifty / Tie her up / Tie her down / Turn her over / Turn her ‘round." reversed. Sausage was headed by Ken Liversausage, a collaborator of Barrett's; both of them appeared on the Aylesbury Goes Flaccid compilation.
"DK 50/80" was created in the studio in such a way that it cannot be performed live easily. Otway sang into a microphone wired up to a delay unit synced up to the bass-drum synth, thus when he sang "Did you...", the unit would output that line directly after. However, during the 'Tent Tour' Barrett would sing the lyrics backwards.

Way & Hal demos 
During April 1979 Otway and guitarist Ollie Halsall (guitar, bass, drums and vocals) recorded some of the songs featured on the album. Halsall's original version of "Traveling Show" was released on his posthumous album Caves. Halsall also played guitar on Otway's previous solo album Where Did I Go Right? and was a collaborator with its producer, Neil Innes,  in The Rutles.

Songs recorded:
Cry Cry
Body Talk
The Man Who Shot Liberty Valence
When Love's In Bloom
Day After Day / 21 Days
Traveling Show
Natasha

The Tent Tour 
Otway & Barrett's record buying public was considerably smaller than the crowds at their gigs so Polydor came up with a marketing strategy tailored to the tour. To attend any of the dates the punter would have to purchase the DK 50/80 single, thus increasing record sales and spreading awareness of the tour. The lack of paid entrance meant that Otway & Barrett got no money from the Tour and thus had to camp around the country when the idea of a large caravan was scuppered by Otway's manager Maurice Bacon.

June
23 Albery’s Wine Bar, CANTERBURY
24 Trinity Hall Community Center, BRISTOL
25 Chapter Ans Center, CARDIFF
26 Crown & Anchor Hotel, Stonehouse, GLOUCESTER
27 Gryphon, Shipley, SOUTHAMPTON
28 Rolley’s Wine Bar, TUNBRIDGE WELLS
29 Oranges & Lemons, OXFORD
30 Nags Head Hotel, Wollaston, NORTHANTS.

July

1 Great Northern Hotel, CAMBRIDGE
2 Cinderella's Night Club, IPSWICH
3 White's, NORWICH
4 Fosseway Hotel, LEICESTER
5 The Millstone, Thomas Street, MANCHESTER 4
7 Golden Eagle, BIRMINGHAM

8 General Wolfe, COVENTRY
9 Grey Goose, Gedling, NOTTS.
10 Rose & Crown, HANLEY
11 Penguin, SHEFFIELD
12 Royal Park Hotel, LEEDS
13 Norbreck Castle Hotel, BLACKPOOL
15 Lincoln's Inn, Rainford Square, LIVERPOOL
16 Cooperage, Quayside, NEWCASTLE—UPON-TYNE
17 Barge Inn, Skellgate, YORK

18 Tabeo Rock Club, SCARBOROUGH
19 Castle Inn, DURHAM
21 Oughton’s, DUMFRIES
22 Bungalow Bar, PAISLEY
23 Eric Brown's, EDINBURGH
24 Wellington Club, HULL

The musicians on the tour are as follows:

John Otway: Vox, Guitar
Wild Willy Barrett: Vox, Guitar, Violin
Mark Freeman: Drums
Alan Offer: Bass

Track listing

Personnel 
 John Otway - vocals, guitar
 Wild Willy Barrett - guitar, violin
 Mark Freeman - drums
 Nigel Pegrum - drums
 Maurice Bacon - drums
 Roger Carey - bass
 Lol Coxhill - saxophone
 Paul Ward - bass

References

1980 albums
John Otway albums
Polydor Records albums